

Colebatch is a locality in the Australian state of South Australia located in the state’s south-east about  south-east of the state capital of Adelaide and about  south-east of the municipal seat in Tailem Bend.

Its boundaries were created on 24 August 2000.  Its name is derived from the cadastral unit of the Hundred of Colebatch.

The majority land use within Colebatch is ’primary production’ and is concerned with “agricultural production.”  Some land in the south which is occupied by the Messent Conservation Park is zoned for ‘conservation’.

The 2016 Australian census which was conducted in August 2016 reports that Colebatch had a population of 71 people.

The locality includes a granite underground tank and guttering system which is listed as a state heritage place on the South Australian Heritage Register.

Colebatch is located within the federal division of Barker, the state electoral district of MacKillop and the local government area of the Coorong District Council.

References

Towns in South Australia